Paomo is a specialty of Shaanxi cuisine and is a typical food eaten in the city of Xi'an and other cities of Guanzhong. It is a hot stew of chopped-up steamed leavened flat bread, known regionally as mo, cooked in lamb broth and served with lamb meat, sometimes substituted with beef.

Lamb paomo is made of lamb soup and a great amount of unleavened flat bread. When making this dish, the cook breaks the bread into small pieces and adds them to the lamb soup. The beef version is beef paomo. Paomo is often eaten with pickled garlic and chili sauce.

Production 
Lamb or beef is boiled with bones, Sichuan pepper, star anise, tsaoko, cinnamon, and other spices until the meat is tender and the broth is done. In traditional restaurants, customers must break up the bread themselves first into thumb-sized chunks before handing it back to the chef. The restaurant then boils the broth, thins it with hot water, and adds in the prepared meat along with cellophane noodles. After the soup is heated up, the broken-up bread is added in before being topped off with spices and a drizzle of lamb oil. Customers may then add chili oil, cilantro, or garlic to their liking. The garlic is sometimes pickled in a sour-sweet vinegar and sugar concoction.

Gallery

Legends
One folktale about its origin is that in the late Five Dynasties and Ten Kingdoms period, Zhao Kuangyin, the Song dynasty's first emperor, returned to his hometown after seeing his betrothed. He had finished up most of his supply on the way back. He had only two pieces of dried plain pancake. He went through a merchant selling lamb soup; Zhao tore the bread into little pieces and mixed it into the soup.

After Zhao Kuangyin became the emperor, he returned to the small merchant place and asked the chief to make the soup again. After eating this old flavor, the freshness and the old memory interwind his heart. He named it "lamb paomo."

See also
 List of lamb dishes
 List of stews
 List of soups

References

Chinese noodles
Shaanxi cuisine
Lamb dishes
Bread soups
Chinese soups and stews